The Island, also called as Island Grounds, is a river island situated on the Coovum River in the northern part of the Indian city of Chennai. The island was created artificially in the early 19th century by merging the Coovum River with the then "Elambore River". An equestrian statue of Sir Thomas Munro, popularly known as "His Stirrupless Majesty", is located on the island. The Madras Gymkhana Club and Pallavan Illam, the headquarters of the Metropolitan Transport Corporation (MTC), Chennai are also located here.  The Island Grounds constitute a vast empty space on the island where fairs and exhibitions are held.

Anna Salai, one of the arterial roads of Chennai, originates on this island, running mostly in the southwest direction towards the south. The Kilometer Zero of Chennai is located at the midpoint of Muthuswamy Bridge on the Muthuswamy Road on the northern side of The Island.

Since 1975, the annual India Tourist and Industrial Fair, popularly known to the locals as the trade fair, is conducted on this island by the state government during the months of January to March.

Notes 

Geography of Chennai
Islands of Chennai
River islands of India
Neighbourhoods in Chennai
Islands of India
Populated places in India